Atlético Madrid C was a Spanish football club that played in the Tercera División and played their home games at the Nuevo Cerro del Espino. They were the second reserve team of Atlético Madrid.

History

Club Names

Season to season

22 seasons in Tercera División

Former players
 Saeid Ezatolahi
 Roberto Casabella
 Nader Matar
 David Cubillo
 Iván Cuellar Sacristán
 Joel Robles
 Jorge Pulido
 Pedro Martín
 Kader Oueslati

References

External links
 Atlético de Madrid Official website
 Futbolme team profile 

1972 establishments in the Community of Madrid
2015 disestablishments in the Community of Madrid
Association football clubs established in 1972
Association football clubs disestablished in 2015
Atlético Madrid
Defunct football clubs in the Community of Madrid
Football clubs in Madrid